The Architects and Engineers Building is an office building in downtown Minneapolis, Minnesota, United States, designed by locally notable architects Hewitt and Brown and built by builders Pike and Cook.  The building was influenced by Hewitt and Brown's relationship with designers who were dedicated to the City Beautiful movement.  They intended to save money by grouping their practices in one building, and they also desired "the special advantage of proximity and the facility for making the knowledge and experience of each available to others."  The building was designed with private executive offices, as well as common drafting rooms, libraries, meeting rooms, and clerical facilities.  The building was also intended for use at night by architectural students who would work in association with practicing professionals.

The building is designed with an Italian Renaissance theme, with different window plans on each level.  The names of prominent architects such as Leonardo da Vinci, Filippo Brunelleschi, Sir Christopher Wren, Charles Follen McKim, and Henry Hobson Richardson are painted in gold within the arches between each pair of third-floor windows.

The building is listed on the National Register of Historic Places for local significance in architecture and commerce.  The building is now occupied by Catholic Charities of Saint Paul and Minneapolis.

See also
 National Register of Historic Places listings in Hennepin County, Minnesota

References

External links
 

National Register of Historic Places in Minneapolis
Office buildings completed in 1920
Office buildings on the National Register of Historic Places in Minnesota
Renaissance Revival architecture in Minnesota